Samuel Simonsen Fedde (1769–1856) was a Norwegian politician.

He was elected to the Norwegian Parliament in 1818, representing the rural constituency of Lister og Mandals Amt (today named Vest-Agder). He sat through only one term.

Hailing from Feda in Kvinesdal, he worked as a sub-postmaster there. He died in 1856.

References

1769 births
1856 deaths
Members of the Storting
Vest-Agder politicians
People from Kvinesdal